Fireflies and Songs is the sixth studio album and ninth overall album from Christian singer and songwriter Sara Groves, and it released on November 17, 2009 by Fair Trade, Columbia Records and Integrity Music. The producer on the album is Charlie Peacock. This release became critically acclaimed and commercially successful.

Background
The album released on November 17, 2009 by Fair Trade, Columbia and Integrity, and it was produced by Charlie Peacock. This was the sixth studio album and ninth album overall from the songstress.

Critical reception

Fireflies and Songs garnered critical acclaim from music critics. At Christianity Today, Andrew Greer rated the album five stars, evoking that the release "probes yet deeper, and even more beautifully, into the fears, doubts, and joys of the human soul." Andree Farias of Allmusic rated the album three-and-a-half stars, highlighting that "Groves' big break may still be farther than ever before, but it's doubtful she cares: Fireflies and Songs is proof she is in this for the long haul." At Cross Rhythms, Peter Timmis rated the album ten out of ten squares, and felt that "the listener is left wanting more."

Kevin Davis of Christian Music Review gave the album a 95-percent, calling it an "excellent work" on which "Sara’s excellent songwriting and captivating piano-based singer-songwriter style have made her my favorite female artist in all of Christian music." At Jesus Freak Hideout, Laura Nunnery Love rated the album four stars, affirming that the release "is an excellent addition to the Sara Groves catalogue." Jen Rose also of Jesus Freak Hideout rated the album four stars, calling the album "some of her most poetic, vulnerable, and transparent music to date." At The Phantom Tollbooth, Bert Saraco rated the album four-and-a-half tocks, felling that her music "stings like a bee." Brian A. Smith also of The Phantom Tollbooth rated the album four-and-a-half tocks, saying that he's "never been displeased with a Groves album, but some stand out more than others", and this "is one of them."

At Christian Broadcasting Network, Monique Derr rated the album three-and-a-half spins, noting how the listener will find "Smooth vocals, comforting words, and strong instrumentation" on the album, and it contains Groves' "rich melodies and silky tone quality make for a relaxing, inspiring, and positive listening experience." Ken Wiegman of Alpha Omega News graded the album a B+, commenting that "The new album is peaceful and a joy to listen to and the personal approach is a welcomed new tool for an already superior artist such as Sara Groves." However, Louder Than the Music' Suzanne Physick rated the album two stars, criticizing that "It's hard to differentiate between most of the songs and the outcome is purely an album of pleasant background music with the occasional lyrical high."

Commercial performance 

For the Billboard charting week of December 5, 2009, Fireflies and Songs was the No. 13 most sold album in the Christian music market via the Christian Albums position, and it was the No. 156 Top Current Album, which are just the new albums out minus the catalog titles in The 200.

For the Billboard charting week of May 29, 2010, the album was the No. 119 most sold album in the entirety of the United States via The Billboard 200 placement, and it was the No. 5 most sold album in the Christian music market segment via the Christian Albums position. In addition, the album was the No. 7 folk album sold by the Folk Albums chart, and it was the No. 47 most sold album in the rock albums category via the Top Rock Albums charting. It was the No. 116 Top Current Album.

Track listing

Personnel 

 Sara Groves – lead vocals, acoustic piano (1–6, 8–11), backing vocals (2, 3, 4, 6, 9, 11)
 Jeff Taylor – accordion (1, 6, 8)
 Charlie Peacock – producer, string arrangements (1, 8), Wurlitzer (3, 7, 9), trumpet (3, 5), Rhodes (4, 5, 9, 11), vibraphone (4, 8), woodwind (5), orchestra percussion (5), keyboards (6, 10), percussion (8), overdub engineer
 Ben Gowell – acoustic guitar (1, 6, 10, 11), electric guitar (1, 3, 4, 9, 10), loops (7), keyboards (10), string arrangements (11), backing vocals (11), tracking engineer, overdub engineer, editing
 Jerry McPherson – guitar (2), electric guitar (4, 5, 8–11), acoustic guitar (7)
 Scott Denté – acoustic guitar (3)
 Bruce Bouton – lap steel guitar (1, 2, 5, 6)
 Andy Leftwich – mandolin (1, 7)
 Aaron Fabbrini – bass, percussion (7), backing vocals (11)
 Zach Miller – drums, percussion (2, 6, 7, 10), backing vocals (11)
 Buddy Greene – harmonica (7)
 David Davidson – strings (1, 8)
 Matt Slocum – strings (1, 8), cello (11)
 Matthew Perryman Jones – backing vocals (1, 2, 9)
 Brian Eichenberger – backing vocals (7, 11)

Production
 Troy Groves – executive producer
 Jeff Moseley – executive producer
 Andy Hunt – tracking engineer
 Richie Biggs – overdub engineer
 Shane Wilson – mixing
 Art House, Nashville, Tennessee – recording location
 Milton Studio, St. Paul, Minnesota – recording location
 Jim DeMain – mastering at Yes Master, Nashville, Tennessee
 Wayne Brezinka – art direction, design and illustration
 Jamie Rau – art direction and photography
 Sarah Deane – coordinator

Charts

References

2009 albums
Sara Groves albums
Fair Trade Services albums
Albums produced by Charlie Peacock